Monster is a 2022 Indian Malayalam-language action thriller film directed by Vysakh, written by Udaykrishna and produced by Antony Perumbavoor. The film stars Mohanlal with Lakshmi Manchu, Honey Rose, Sudev Nair, Siddique, K. B. Ganesh Kumar, Lena, Johny Antony and Jagapathi Babu in a cameo appearance. It was also the third installment of Udayakrishna Cinematic Universe.

Principal photography for the film began in November 2021 and ended in January 2022, which took place extensively in Cochin. It is the second film of Mohanlal and Vysakh after Pulimurugan (2016). Monster was released theatrically on 21 October 2022 and received mixed to negative reviews It was a box office failure.

Plot
Bhamini (Honey Rose) and Anil Chandra (Sudev Nair) are a married couple who have a daughter named Kunjatta from Anil's first wife, and live a happy life with their caretaker Durga (Lakshmi Manchu). Anil, who used to be a software engineer but was fired from his company, becomes a taxi driver to survive. However, Anil suffers a leg injury due to an accident, and Bhamini takes up his job and begins to take care of the family's finances. When Bhamini is about to leave to celebrate their first wedding anniversary, her boss tells her to pick up a passenger named Lucky Singh (Mohanlal) from airport. Bhamini reluctantly agrees and arrives at the airport. Bhamini meets Lucky Singh who shares his story on the way back, and tells her that he's in the city to sell a flat that belonged to his father.

Lucky Singh accompanies Bhamini to her house as the flat's buyers get delayed, and takes part in the anniversary celebrations.  After receiving the money from the buyers, Lucky Singh requests Bhamini to deliver the money to his lawyer, citing other urgent work. When Bhamini leaves, Lucky Singh goes back and shoots Anil and records the shooting. Bhamini and Lucky Singh leave for the airport, with Lucky Singh stashing Anil's corpse in Bhamini's car. After reaching the airport, Lucky Singh leaves. Bhamini learns about Anil and Kunjatta's disappearance, and is worried. Bhamini, along with Durga and Anil's friend complain to the police. C.I Mariyam George (Lena) suspects Bhamini, as she always evaded vehicle checks.

S.P Joseph (K. B. Ganesh Kumar), Mariyam and his team checks Bhamini's flat where they find Anil's corpse in the car's trunk along with the video and a gun. The police interrogate Bhamini, who tells that her real name is Rosie and she was given the name by Anil after marriage. Mariyam and Joseph interrogate the flat's security guard and check the CCTV footage, but learn that nobody had accompanied Bhamini in the car and also learn about Lucky Singh and his lawyer. She subsequently learns that the lawyer is fake. Meanwhile, DGP Chandrashekhar (Siddique) tells Joseph and Mariyam to produce Bhamini in court. When they arrive at the court, unknown men attack the convoy and take Bhamini. It is later revealed that these were Bhamini's own men, staging an abduction.
 
Police bring in the original Lucky Singh (Jagapathi Babu ) who is the owner of the She-Taxi firm where Bhamini was working, and it is revealed that the man who was posing as Lucky Singh is actually an undercover IPS officer from the Central Government named Shivdev Subramaniam IPS who is the Additional Director of the Central Crime Branch, and who was tasked with nabbing Bhamini. Shivdev arrives at the commissioner's office and reveals that Bhamini's real name is Rebecca, who with her secret accomplice were actually responsible for the murders of three men. Their modus operandi was killing them on their first wedding anniversaries and stealing their insurance money, thereafter. Shivdev had learnt that Rebecca's next target was Anil, so he told Anil about Rebecca's crimes, who later cooperated to capture them. Shivdev also had a hand in having Rebecca work as a taxi driver and had her to pick him at the airport. This was apparently to destroy the anniversary cake by pretending to play with Kunjatta, as Rebecca had laced the cake with a lethal drug. He had also faked Anil's death.

When Rebecca escapes from custody, Shivdev follows Rebecca and finds that her accomplice was actually Durga, whose real name is Catherine Alexandra. He confronts the duo and Rebecca reveals that she and Catherine were lesbians who fell in love during their childhood days in an orphanage. However, they were ostracized by the community and banished from the orphanage. In 2011, because Haryana passed legislation that shielded LGBT rights, they got married there. During their honeymoon, they were publically humiliated by the local police force. Unable to bear further humiliation, they planned to move overseas, where they would have their rights. However, because they did not have enough money to move, they planned to steal insurance money of the four people. A fight ensues, where Shivdev subdues the duo and arrests them, solving the case.

Cast
 
 Mohanlal as Lucky Singh (fake) / Shivdev Subramaniam IPS, Additional Director of Central Crime Branch
Lakshmi Manchu as Durga/Catherine Alexandera
 Honey Rose as Rebecca/Bhamini Anil Chandra/Christina Luther/Raziya Fathima/Rakhi Thakur
 Sudev Nair as Anil Chandra
 Siddique as ADGP Chandrashekhar IPS 
 K. B. Ganesh Kumar as SP Joseph Cheriyan IPS 
 Lena as CI Mariyam George 
 Jess Sweejan as Kunjatta
 Kailash as Raja Ravi Varma
 Arjun Nandhakumar as Rashid Ahammed, Shivdev's team member
 Johny Antony as Varghese / Adv. Vasavan (Fake)
 Idavela Babu as Adv. Vasavan (Original)
 Nandu Pothuval as Juice shop owner 
 Biju Pappan as CI Vijayakumar
 Swasika as Diana 
 Anjali Nair as SI Gayathri
 Sadhika Venugopal as SI Soumya 
 Manju Satheesh as Flat Caretaker Susan
 Laya Simpson as Laya / Jennifer, Shivdev's team member 
 Jagapathi Babu as Lucky Singh (Original) (cameo appearance)

Production

Development
Monster was announced by Mohanlal through his social media profiles on 10 November 2021, along with a poster crediting him as Lucky Singh, to be directed by Vysakh, written by Udaykrishna, and produced by Antony Perumbavoor. Filming also began on the same day. Vysakh said the idea came during the COVID-19 pandemic in India when large-scale productions, like his earlier collaborations with Udaykrishna, was difficult to execute. Hence, he thought of doing a film "that focused on the craft by using the strength of the content". He appreciated Mohanlal and Antony for taking the project, "they understood its merit from the point of view of artistes and stood by it. They could have rejected it and asked us to do a pure mass film, which we are experts at". According to Vysakh, the film falls under thriller genre. Mohanlal sees it as a crime-thriller. Udaykrishna said "it's an experimental film. I have kept aside the ingredients that are often seen in my movies for Monster, which is a thriller".

Casting
Mohanlal plays a turban-clad Lucky Singh. It was the first Punjabi character in his career. Telugu actress Lakshmi Manchu made her Malayalam debut with Monster. She took martial art lessons in kalaripayattu for her role. About her role, she that "it was an opportunity for me to push myself and step out of my comfort zone". Manchu was called for the role by Mohanlal. Sudev Nair also has a major role. Honey Rose plays Bhamini, whom she credited as one of the best characters she had done until then. Child actress Jess Sweejan plays the other important role. Lena, K. B. Ganesh Kumar, and Siddique also plays vital characters.

Filming
Principal photography began on 10 November 2021. Its first schedule was completed on 20 November. Filming was held at Kochi. Every personnel on set was subjected to COVID-19 testing and the film was shot within a controlled environment and had entry restriction. For two weeks, the film was shot inside a set at VVM Studios, Eloor. Mohanlal, Manchu, Rose, Nair, and Jess performed in these portions. Monster was shot extensively in Kochi. The whole filming lasted 55 days, which was wrapped in January 2022. It took another nine months for the release. According to Vysakh, the film required extensive post-production work compared to other films. Satheesh Kurup was the cinematographer, Shajie Naduvil was the art director, Shameer Muhammed was the editor, Sujith Sudhakaran designed the costumes, and Stunt Silva composed the actions.

Music
The film's original music was composed, arranged, and programmed by Deepak Dev. Audio mixing was done at Dev's Wonderland studio in Dubai. It was mastered by Gethin John at Hafod Mastering studio in London. The soundtrack album was distributed by the label Aashirvad Audios and Videos.

Release

Theatrical
In March 2022, Vysakh said that he was unaware of the film's release date and have not decided whether it should be released in theatres or OTT, which would be decided by the producer. He further added "I believe Monster will work both in theatres as well as OTT because of the strength of its content". In August, media reported a release date on 30 September 2022. It was later reported that it has been changed to 21 October to release around Diwali. The date was confirmed by Mohanlal in October, as a worldwide release.

Censorship
In India, Monster was rated UA by the Central Board of Film Certification, with a certified runtime of 135.26 minutes.

With only a few days left to release, the film was reportedly banned in all Gulf Cooperation Council (GCC) countries, except the United Arab Emirates (UAE) where decision was pending, citing the presence of LGBTQ content, thus failing to receive film certification. The makers re-submitted the film for certification after censoring the aforementioned scenes, which was due on 18 October. Bahrain lifted the ban after 13 minutes of the film was cut. Reportedly, the film had a delayed release in Gulf countries.

Home Media
The digital rights of the film was acquired by Disney+ Hotstar and started streaming from 2 December 2022. The satellite rights of the film are owned by Asianet.

Reception

Critical response 
Monster received mixed to negative reviews from critics.

Roktim Rajpal of India Today rated the film 2.5 out of 5 and wrote "Monster isn’t really Mohanlal's best work by any stretch of the imagination. It, however, may have just about enough to satisfy the veteran star’s ardent fans". Anjana George of The Times of India rated the film 2.0 out of 5 stars and wrote "The film is all about a monster who has the choice to use the trust of his fans to take up the Malayalam cinema or to bring it down". Padmakumar K of Onmanorama wrote that, 'The charming visuals and faces which fill the frames and an impactful BGM by Deepak Dev will keep viewers glued to the screen.'. S. R. Praveen on The Hindu called the film "an endurance test", criticising the writing, action, Mohanlal's character and his humor, as well as the depiction of LGBT characters; Cris from The News Minute voiced similar disapprovals. Sajin Shrijith of Cinema Express rated the film 0.5 out of 5 stars and wrote "Mohanlal said the film's screenplay is both hero and villain. Well, having seen the movie, I can say I understood half of it". Nidhima Taneja of The Print rated the film 1.5 out of 5 stars and wrote "Monster, performed by the cinema giant, does little to satiate your cinematic appetite. Perhaps, it should have been called off at the reading table". Anna M.M. Vetticad of Firstpost rated the film 0.25 out of 5 stars and wrote "Sikhs, Punjabis and homosexuals are not viewed as people by the team of Monster. Instead, they’re seen as gimmicks, tools to build suspense and write grand reveals in a crime drama". Criticizing Mohanlal’s acting and the “unfailingly superficial script”, she noted that “The stereotyping of LGBT-plus persons (...) is unrelenting.”

References

https://realtimeindia.in/mohanlals-latest-monster-movie-ott-release-date-finalized/

External links
 
 

2022 films
2022 action thriller films
2022 LGBT-related films
Indian action thriller films
Indian LGBT-related films
Lesbian-related films
2020s Malayalam-language films
Films directed by Vysakh
Films scored by Deepak Dev
Aashirvad Cinemas films
Films shot in Kochi